Rhytiodus is a genus of headstander from the Amazon Basin in South America.  There are currently four described species.

Species
 Rhytiodus argenteofuscus Kner, 1858
 Rhytiodus elongatus (Steindachner, 1908)
 Rhytiodus lauzannei Géry, 1987
 Rhytiodus microlepis Kner, 1858

References

External link 

 https://www.fishbase.se/summary/Rhytiodus-argenteofuscus
 https://amazonwaters.org/fish/aracus/

Anostomidae
Taxa named by Rudolf Kner
Fish of South America